= União Building =

- Edifício União
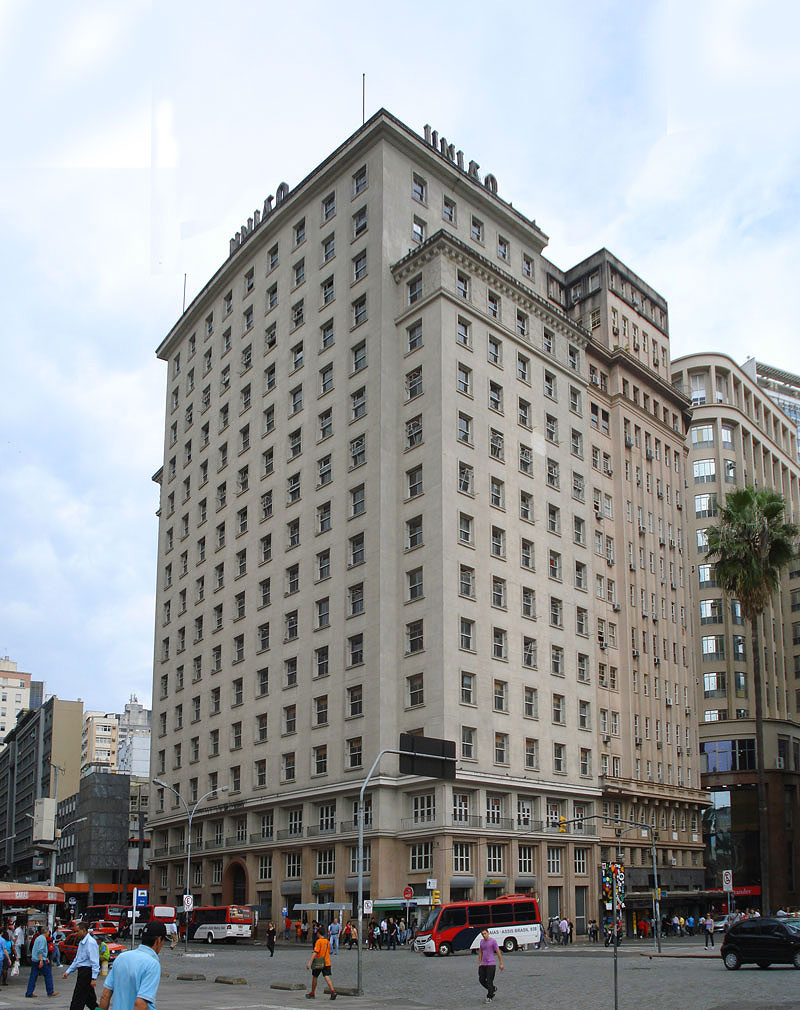
- The União Building in 2009
- Click on the map for a fullscreen view

General information
- Location: Porto Alegre, Brazil
- Coordinates: 30°01′43.72″S 51°13′42.24″W

The União Building (Portuguese: Edifício União) is a historic building located in Porto Alegre, Brazil.

== History ==
The construction of the building was conceived in 1940, while the drafting of its design by architect Arnaldo Gladosch dates to three years later. The building was then completed in 1952.

The building was reopened in 2012 after renovation works that cost 12 million reais.

== Description ==
The building is located along Avenida Borges de Medeiros in the center of Porto Alegre.
